Drakes Branch is a town in Charlotte County, Virginia, United States. The population was 530 at the 2010 census.

Geography
Drakes Branch is located southeast of the center of Charlotte County at  (36.992958, −78.601714). Virginia State Route 47 passes through the town, leading north  to Charlotte Court House, the county seat, and southeast  to U.S. Route 15. Virginia State Route 59 intersects Route 47 in the north part of town and leads northeast  to Keysville.

Demographics

At the 2000 census there were 504 people, 231 households, and 134 families living in the town. The population density was 121.8 people per square mile (47.0/km²). There were 262 housing units at an average density of 63.3 per square mile (24.4/km²).  The racial makeup of the town was 59.33% White, 40.08% African American, 0.20% from other races, and 0.40% from two or more races. Hispanic or Latino of any race were 1.98%.

Of the 231 households 21.6% had children under the age of 18 living with them, 39.0% were married couples living together, 14.3% had a female householder with no husband present, and 41.6% were non-families. 35.5% of households were one person and 14.7% were one person aged 65 or older. The average household size was 2.18 and the average family size was 2.81.

The age distribution was 20.4% under the age of 18, 6.5% from 18 to 24, 24.4% from 25 to 44, 28.4% from 45 to 64, and 20.2% 65 or older. The median age was 44 years. For every 100 females, there were 88.8 males. For every 100 females age 18 and over, there were 91.0 males.

The median income for a household in the town was $25,583, and the median family income  was $35,000. Males had a median income of $25,469 versus $17,500 for females. The per capita income for the town was $15,701. About 8.2% of families and 16.8% of the population were below the poverty line, including 20.5% of those under age 18 and 14.3% of those age 65 or over.

References

External links
Town website

Towns in Charlotte County, Virginia